Escola da Ponte (English: School of the Bridge) is an open plan school in an elementary school, located in São Tomé de Negrelos, Portugal, which was started by José Francisco Pacheco in 1976 and follows the principles of democratic education. The school is organized and totally run by students, mainly governed by a weekly deliberative assembly with them and the professors and the parents. Students also there are not divided in classes but in dynamic groups, and they choose what to study having as the main criteria, what they want to learn.

It has embodied Meaningful Student Involvement in classrooms successfully.

References

External links
 What have you done today to change the world? A different learning method, by Cláudia Gomes Oliveira, Van Der Love, April 10, 2018
 A new education is possible, Written by Maria Occarina Macedo, May 30, 2012

Schools in Portugal
Democratic free schools
Elementary schools in Portugal
1976 establishments in Portugal
Educational institutions established in 1976